The Abbey Experimental Theatre Company was a small company run by a group of young actors associated with the Peacock Theatre in the Abbey Theatre, Dublin, Ireland.

History
The Abbey Experimental Theatre Company opened on 5 April 1937, founded by actress Ria Mooney. Mooney's founding statement for the Experimental Theatre was: "for the production of plays by Irish authors whose work was considered not suitable or not sufficiently advanced technically for production on the Abbey stage, and yet was of sufficiently high standard to merit public presentation." The inaugural play was Mervyn Wall's Alarm Among the Clerks.

The Experimental Theatre was considered to be non-commercial, and had a limited audience. By virtue of its experimental nature, it staged plays that would have not been produced in Ireland otherwise. Following the fire in the Abbey in 1951, no provision was made for the Experimental Theatre in the plans or funding for the new Abbey building.

Alarm Among the Clerks
Alarm Among the Clerks was a play written by Mervyn Wall and directed by Cecil F. Ford. It was first performed on Monday, 5 April 1937, and performed as part of a double bill with The Phoenix. "The action is laid in a room in Slattery's bank and a local public house. The first act, in the bank, portrays office life quite well...the came the experiment. In the green light the audience was transported back to the office...the ending was rather everly contrived."

Synopsis 
A play about the deadly tedium of day-to-day life for employees in a bank. The clerks complain to each other about 'the system' meaning both capitalism and their own particular bank's ethos. They retire to the local pub for a drink and inebriation conjures up a dream version of banking life to be played out after the realism of the opening.

Cast 

 Cecil Barror - Mr Plus
 Victor Boyd - Publican
 Brian Carey - Mr Finn
 Frank Carney - Mr Selskar
 Malachi Keegan - Mr Mullin
 Dermot Kelly - Street Singer
 Michael Kinsella - Harkin
 John McDarby - Mr Doody
 Austin Meldon - Mr Ireton
 Geroid Ó'hÍceadha - Mr Fox
 Anne Potter - Miss Noone
 Shela Ward - Miss Boyd

Crew 

 Cecil F. Ford - Director
 Malachi Keegan - Stage Manager

 Geroid Ó'hÍceadha - Set Construction and Set Designer

 Anne Yeats - Costume Designer and Scenic Painting

The Phoenix
The Phoenix is a play written by Nino Bartholomew, it was first performed in the Peacock, directed by Frank Carney, on Monday, 5 April 1937 as a double bill with Alarm Among the Clerks. The production ran for 6 nights. "There was little good about it except Mr Cecil Barror's portrayal of Oliver Goldsmith... There was too much rough and tumble (the stage is too small for it) and the combination of comedy and tragedy in the young student's life is not too good."

Cast 

 Cecil Barror - Oliver Goldsmith
 Brian Carey - Dr. Theaker Wilder
 Áine Cox - Catty Kiernan
 Cecil F. Ford - Edward Mills
 Dermot Kelly - O'Reilly
 Austin Meldon - Jack Beatty
 Mary O'Neill - Peggy O'Shaughnessy

Crew 

 Malachi Keegan - Stage Manager
 Dermot Kelly - Assistant Stage Manager

 Geroid Ó'hÍceadha - Carpenter Set Designer

 Anne Yeats - Costume Designer and Scenic Artist

Harlequin's Positions
Harlequin's Positions is a play written by Jack B. Yeats, and first performed Monday, 5 June 1939. The production ran for 6 nights. It was co-directed by members of the acting company, Ria Mooney and Cecil F. Ford. The script of Harlequin's Positions was long presumed lost. The Irish Times reported in 1966 that an Oxford academic had finally located the missing typescript with the help of the artist's niece, Anne Yeats. A handwritten script is currently held as part of the Jack B. Yeats Collection in the archives of NUI Galway.

Synopsis 
Rumours of war force a wealthy heiress to cut short her cruise and introduce tension and disquiet to a small Sligo town, it is set in the fictional town of Portnadroleen, County Sligo.

Cast 

 Victor Boyd - First Pilot
 Wilfred Brambell - Alfred Clonboise
 Finbarr Howard - Boy
 Dermot Kelly - Second Porter
 Michael Kinsella - First Porter
 Sheila Maguire - Claire Gillane
 John McDarby - Second Pilot
 Evelyn McNiece - Madame Rose Bosanquet
 Moira McSwiggan - Kate
 Robert Mooney - Johnnie Gillane
 Geroid Ó'hÍceadha - Guard
 Sarah O'Kelly - Apple Woman
 Anne Potter - Annie Jennings

Crew 

 Ria Mooney - Director
 Cecil F. Ford - Director
 John Mc Darby - Stage Manager

 Michael Kinsella - Assistant Stage Manager

 Anne Yeats - Scenic Artist and Set Designer
 Geroid Ó'hÍceadha - Carpenter

The Wild Cat (1940) 
The Wild Cat is a three act play by Gerard Malone, set in the kitchen and living room of the bungalow house of the Moynan Family. First performed by the Abbey Experimental Theatre on Sunday, 18 February 1940. It was produced by Lennox Robinson.

Cast 

 Shela Ward - Mrs Moynan
 Sheila Carty - Molly
 Colm Hogan - Martin
 Austin Meldon - Hugh
 Cecil Ford - Allan
 Josephine Fitzgerald - Mrs Fintan
 Kitty Ryan - Betty
 Sheila Maguire - Nurse Brown

Crew 

 Robert mooney - Stage Manager
 Evelyn McNiece - Assistant Stage Manager
 Anne Yeats - Settings Designer
 Desmond Leslie - Scenic Painter
 John McDarby - Set Constructor

Cavaliero (The Life of a Hawk)
Cavaliero (The Life of a Hawk) is a play by Terence Smith directed by H.L. Morrow. It was first performed on Monday, 25 October 1948 alongside two other plays, The Briery Gap and Light Falling.

Cast 

 Raghnall Breathnach - Dinny
 Eamonn Guaillí - His Honour

Crew 

 H.L. Morrow - Director
 Anne Yeats - Set Designer

Members of The Theatre

Patrons 

 Lennox Robinson
 Dr Walter Starkie
 Dr Richard Hayes
 Ernest Blythe
 F. R. Higgins

Committee 

 Ria Mooney
 Josephine Fitzgerald
 Evelyn McNiece
 Anne Porter
 Shela Ward
 Cecil F. Ford
 John McDarby

Hon. Secretaries 

 Anne Potter
 Moira McSwiggan

Business Managers 

 P. H. Considine
 Cecil F. Ford

Treasurers 

 Josephine Fitzgerald
 Shela Ward

References

Abbey Theatre
Experimental theatre